Luciano Lopes de Souza (born 2 December 1974 in Maceió), known as Bilú, is a retired Brazilian professional football player, who played as defensive midfielder and a manager.

References

External links
 
 
 

1974 births
América Futebol Clube (SP) players
Associação Atlética Ponte Preta players
Association football midfielders
Brasiliense Futebol Clube players
Brazilian football managers
Brazilian footballers
Campeonato Brasileiro Série A players
Campeonato Brasileiro Série B players
Campeonato Brasileiro Série C players
Campeonato Brasileiro Série D managers
Centro Sportivo Alagoano players
Clube Atlético Mineiro players
Clube de Regatas Brasil players
Clube Náutico Capibaribe players
Coritiba Foot Ball Club players
Esporte Clube Noroeste players
Figueirense FC players
Goiás Esporte Clube players
Guarani FC players
Living people
Murici Futebol Clube managers
Murici Futebol Clube players
People from Maceió
União Agrícola Barbarense Futebol Clube players
Sportspeople from Alagoas